The Spike Scream Awards is an award show dedicated to the horror, sci-fi, and fantasy genres of feature films. The show was created by executive producers Michael Levitt, Cindy Levitt, and Casey Patterson.

Billed as Scream 2008, the 2008 ceremony was held on October 18, 2008 at The Greek Theatre in Los Angeles.  It premiered on Tuesday, October 21, 2008.  Performances included The Smashing Pumpkins and Kerli.

Special awards
Comic-Con Icon Award – George Lucas
Scream Immortal Award – Tim Burton
Scream Legend Award – Anthony Hopkins
Scream Mastermind Award – Wes Craven

World Premieres
 Twilight presented by Cam Gigandet
 Friday the 13th presented by Jared Padalecki, Amanda Righetti and Derek Mears
 Watchmen presented by Malin Åkerman, Carla Gugino, Jeffrey Dean Morgan, Zack Snyder and Gerard Way

Performances
 "Walking on Air" performed by Kerli
 "G.L.O.W." performed by The Smashing Pumpkins

Competitive Categories
Nominees and winners for each announced category are listed below. Winners are listed in boldface.

Best Fantasy Movie
 Hellboy II: The Golden Army
 Beowulf
 The Dark Knight
 Hancock
 The Incredible Hulk
 Wanted

Best Fantasy Actor
 Heath Ledger, The Dark Knight
 Christian Bale, The Dark Knight
 James McAvoy, Wanted
 Edward Norton, The Incredible Hulk
 Ron Perlman, Hellboy II: The Golden Army

Best Fantasy Actress
 Angelina Jolie, Wanted
 Amy Adams, Enchanted
 Selma Blair, Hellboy II: The Golden Army
 Maggie Gyllenhaal, The Dark Knight
 Hayden Panettiere, Heroes
 Charlize Theron, Hancock

Best Comic Book
 Y: The Last Man
 Astonishing X-Men
 The League of Extraordinary Gentlemen: The Black Dossier
 Hack/Slash
 The Umbrella Academy
 The Walking Dead

Best Villain
 Heath Ledger as The Joker, The Dark Knight
 Tobin Bell as Jigsaw, Saw IV
 Jeff Bridges as Iron Monger, Iron Man
 Aaron Eckhart as Two-Face, The Dark Knight
 Zachary Quinto as Sylar, Heroes
 Alan Rickman as Judge Turpin, Sweeney Todd: The Demon Barber of Fleet Street

Most Memorable Mutilation
 Penis Bitten off by Vagina with Teeth, Teeth
 Attacked by the Flesh Eating Tooth Fairies, Hellboy II: The Golden Army
 Attacked By The Infected; I Am Legend
 The Autopsy, Saw IV
 The Leg Amputation, The Ruins
 The Pencil Trick; The Dark Knight

Best Horror Actor
 Johnny Depp, Sweeney Todd: The Demon Barber of Fleet Street
 Fernando Cayo, The Orphanage
 Thomas Jane, The Mist
 Stephen Moyer, True Blood
 Jared Padalecki, Supernatural
 Jonathan Tucker, The Ruins

Best TV Show
 Dexter
 Battlestar Galactica
 Heroes
 Lost
 Reaper
 Terminator: The Sarah Connor Chronicles

Best Horror Actress

Best Supporting Actor
 Gary Oldman, The Dark Knight
 Jason Bateman, Hancock
 Michael Caine, The Dark Knight
 Terrence Howard, Iron Man
 Doug Jones, Hellboy II: The Golden Army
 Shia LaBeouf, Indiana Jones and the Kingdom of the Crystal Skull

Best Science Fiction Movie
 Iron Man
 Cloverfield
 I Am Legend
 Indiana Jones and the Kingdom of the Crystal Skull
 Southland Tales
 Wall-E

Best Superhero
 Christian Bale as Batman
 Robert Downey Jr. as Iron Man
 Ron Perlman as Hellboy
 Edward Norton as Hulk
 Will Smith as Hancock

Best Science Fiction Actress
 Milla Jovovich, Resident Evil: Extinction
 Odette Annable, Cloverfield
 Summer Glau, Terminator: The Sarah Connor Chronicles
 Lena Headey, Terminator: The Sarah Connor Chronicles
 Tricia Helfer, Battlestar Galactica
 Gwyneth Paltrow, Iron Man

Best Science Fiction Actor
 Robert Downey Jr., Iron Man
 Harrison Ford, Indiana Jones and the Kingdom of the Crystal Skull
 Dwayne Johnson, Southland Tales
 Edward James Olmos, Battlestar Galactica
 Will Smith, I Am Legend
 David Tennant, Doctor Who

Breakout Performance
 WALL-E, WALL-E
 Odette Annable, Cloverfield
 Anna Friel, Pushing Daisies
 Jessica Lucas, Cloverfield
 T.J. Miller, Cloverfield
 Anna Walton, Hellboy II: The Golden Army

Best Director
 Christopher Nolan, The Dark Knight
 Tim Burton, Sweeney Todd: The Demon Barber of Fleet Street
 Frank Darabont, The Mist
 Guillermo del Toro, Hellboy II: The Golden Army
 Jon Favreau, Iron Man
 Rob Zombie, Halloween

Best Sequel
 The Dark Knight
 The Chronicles of Narnia: Prince Caspian
 Hellboy II: The Golden Army
 Indiana Jones and the Kingdom of the Crystal Skull
 Resident Evil: Extinction
 Saw IV

Best F/X
 The Dark Knight
 Beowulf
 Cloverfield
 Hellboy II: The Golden Army
 Iron Man
 Wanted

Best Remake
 Halloween
 The Eye
 Funny Games
 The Incredible Hulk
 Journey to the Center of Earth
 Prom Night

Best Line
 "I believe whatever doesn't kill you makes you stranger", The Dark Knight
 "Hulk Smash", The Incredible Hulk
 "I am Iron Man", Iron Man
 "I'm not a baby, I'm a tumor", Hellboy II: The Golden Army
 "I'm gonna make this pencil disappear", The Dark Knight
 "Why so serious?", The Dark Knight

Best Comic Book Artist
 Gabriel Ba, The Umbrella Academy: Apocalypse Suite
 Darwyn Cooke, The Spirit
 Pia Guerra, Y: The Last Man
 Jim Lee, All-Star Batman and Robin the Boy Wonder
 Joe Quesada, The Amazing Spider-Man
 Alex Ross, Project Superpowers

Best Comic Book Writer
 Grant Morrison
 Warren Ellis
 Robert Kirkman
 Mike Mignola
 Alan Moore
 Brian K. Vaughan

Best Comic Book Movie
 The Dark Knight
 30 Days of Night
 Hellboy II: The Golden Army
 The Incredible Hulk
 Iron Man
 Wanted

The Ultimate Scream
 The Dark Knight
 Cloverfield
 Hellboy II: The Golden Army
 Iron Man
 Lost
 The Mist

Best Scream-Play
 The Dark Knight
 Cloverfield
 Iron Man
 The Mist
 The Orphanage
 WALL-E

Best Scream-To-Comic-Adaptation
 Buffy the Vampire Slayer Season Eight
 Army of Darkness
 Battlestar Galactica
 Freddy vs. Jason vs. Ash
 A Nightmare on Elm Street
 The Texas Chainsaw Massacre

The Holy Sh!t Scene of the Year
 Big Rig Flips Over, The Dark Knight
 Iron Man’s First Flight, Iron Man
 The Statue of Liberty Attack, Cloverfield
 The Reverse Kill Shot, Wanted
 The Batmobile/Batpod chase, The Dark Knight
 Escape from Ten Rings hideout, Iron Man

See also
 Saturn Award

References

Scream Awards